HD 43197 b is an extrasolar planet which orbits the G-type main sequence or subgiant star HD 43197, located approximately 204 light years away in the constellation Canis Major. This planet has a minimum mass 55% that of Jupiter and takes 0.85 years to orbit the star at a semimajor axis of 0.882 AU. Its has a high eccentricity of 0.74, but its inclination is not known. This planet was detected by HARPS on October 19, 2009, together with 29 other planets.

In 2022, a second super-Jovian planet was discovered orbiting HD 43197 using a combination of radial velocity and astrometry.

The planet HD 43197 b is named Equiano. The name was selected in the NameExoWorlds campaign by Nigeria, during the 100th anniversary of the IAU. Olaudah Equiano was a writer and abolitionist from Ihiala, Nigeria who fought injustice and for the elimination of the slave trade.

References 

Exoplanets discovered in 2010
Exoplanets detected by radial velocity
Giant planets
Canis Major
Exoplanets with proper names